The 1993 FIBA Europe Under-16 Championship (known at that time as 1993 European Championship for Cadets) was the 12th edition of the FIBA Europe Under-16 Championship. The cities of Trabzon, Giresun and Samsun, in Turkey, hosted the tournament. Greece won the trophy for the second time.

Teams

Preliminary round
The twelve teams were allocated in two groups of six teams each.

Group A

Group B

Knockout stage

9th–12th playoffs

5th–8th playoffs

Championship

Final standings

References
FIBA Archive
FIBA Europe Archive

FIBA U16 European Championship
1993–94 in European basketball
1993 in Turkish sport
1993
1993–94
1993–94
1993
August 1993 sports events in Turkey